The 2013 La Flèche Wallonne Féminine is the 16th running of the La Flèche Wallonne Féminine, a women's single-day cycling race held in Belgium and is the fourth race of the 2013 UCI Women's Road World Cup season.

Course
The 131.5 km event started in Huy, where the riders rode two laps of a tough circuit including the steep Mur de Huy (The wall of Huy) climb, with several sections steeper than 15% and up to 26% on one section. The finish was at the top of the Mur after the second ascent.

Mountain passes and hills
At 18.5 km & 84.5 km: Côte d'Ereffe – 2.1 km climb of 5.9%
At 37.0 km & 103.5 km: Côte de Peu d'Eau – 2.7 km climb of 3.9%
At 42.5 km & 108.5 km: Côte de Bellaire – 1.0 km climb of 6.8%
At 49.5 km & 116.0 km: Côte de Bohissau – 1.3 km climb of 7.6%
At 53.0 km & 119.0 km: Côte de Bousalle – 1.7 km climb of 4.9%
At 65.5 km & 131.5 km: Mur de Huy – 1.3 km climb of 9.3%
Source

Results

Source

World Cup standings
Standings after 4 of 8 2013 UCI Women's Road World Cup races.

Individuals

Source

Teams

Source

References

External links

2013 in Belgian sport
2013 UCI Women's Road World Cup
2013